Yevgeni Vladimirovich Ovsyannikov (born 13 March 1982 in Voronezh) is a former Russian football player.

References

1982 births
Footballers from Voronezh
Living people
Russian footballers
FC Fakel Voronezh players
Russian Premier League players
FC Salyut Belgorod players
Association football forwards